SAGE (Soviet–American Gallium Experiment, or sometimes Russian-American Gallium Experiment) is a collaborative experiment devised by several prominent physicists to measure the solar neutrino flux.

The Experiment
SAGE was devised to measure the radio-chemical solar neutrino flux based on the inverse beta decay reaction, 71Ga71Ge. The target for the reaction was 50-57 tonnes of liquid gallium metal stored deep (2100 meters) underground at the Baksan Neutrino Observatory in the Caucasus mountains in Russia. The laboratory containing the SAGE-experiment is called gallium-germanium neutrino telescope (GGNT) laboratory, GGNT being the name of the SAGE experimental apparatus. About once a month, the neutrino induced Ge is extracted from the Ga. 71Ge is unstable with respect to electron capture ( days) and, therefore, the amount of extracted germanium can be determined from its activity as measured in small proportional counters.

The experiment had begun to measure the solar neutrino capture rate with a target of gallium metal in December 1989 and continued to run in August 2011 with only a few brief interruptions in the timespan. As of 2013 is the experiment was described as "being continued" with the latest published data from August 2011. As of 2014 it was stated that the SAGE experiment continues the once-a-month extractions. The SAGE experiment continued in 2016. As of 2017, the SAGE-experiment continues.

The experiment has measured the solar neutrino flux in 168 extractions between January 1990 and December 2007. (syst.) SNU. This represents only 56%-60% of the capture rate predicted by different Standard Solar Models, which predict 138 SNU. The difference is in agreement with neutrino oscillations.

The collaboration has used a 518 kCi 51Cr neutrino source to test the experimental operation. The energy of these neutrinos is similar to the solar 7Be neutrinos and thus makes an ideal check on the experimental procedure. The extractions for the Cr experiment took place between January and May 1995 and the counting of the samples lasted until fall. This indicates that the discrepancy between the solar model predictions and the SAGE flux measurement cannot be an experimental artifact. Also calibrations with a 37Ar neutrino source had been performed.

Baksan Experiment on Sterile Transitions (BEST) 
In 2014, the SAGE-experiment's GGNT-apparatus (gallium-germanium neutrino telescope) was upgraded to perform a very-short-baseline neutrino oscillation experiment BEST (Baksan Experiment on Sterile Transitions) with an intense artificial neutrino source based on 51Cr. In 2017, the BEST apparatus was completed, but the artificial neutrino source was missing. As of 2018, the BEST experiment was underway. As of 2018, a follow-up experiment BEST-2 where the source would be changed to 65Zn was under consideration. In June 2022, the BEST experiment released two papers observing a 20-24% deficit in the production the isotope germanium expected from the reaction  71Ga71Ge, summing evidence for the so called "Gallium anomaly" pointing out that a sterile neutrino explanation can be consistent with the data.

Members of SAGE
SAGE is led by the following physicists:

Vladimir Gavrin (leader of the experiment as of 2017)
Georgiy Zatsepin (Joint Institute for Nuclear Research, Russia)
Thomas J. Bowles (Los Alamos)

See also
 GALLEX/GNO was the second (of two) large gallium-germanium radiochemical experiment. It was running in 1991-2003.
Hans Bethe was the architect of the theory of nuclear fusion reactions in stars.
The University of Washington is playing a major role in the statistical analysis of the SAGE data and in the determination of systematic uncertainties. They are very active in the remaining analysis of the Cr experiment data as well as the solar neutrino data.

References

Literature

External links
 The web page of the experiment in the University of Washington
Old page (1994) with results of the experiments
 Some results (2001) 
Hans Bethe talking about SAGE (video)
SAGE experiment record on INSPIRE-HEP

Particle experiments
Soviet Union–United States relations
Science and technology in the Soviet Union
Science and technology in the United States
Science and technology in Russia